This is a list of alumni of Exeter College, Oxford. Exeter is one of the colleges of the University of Oxford.

The scarcity of women in this list of notable alumni reflects the fact that for over six and a half centuries (from its foundation in 1314 until 1979), women were barred from studying at Exeter.

Those educated at the college include:

Clergy
 James Aitken (1829–1908), clergyman and sportsman, competed in the Varsity cricket match three times and the 1849 Boat Race
 James Aitken (d 1687), Bishop of Galloway
 E. E. Bradford (1860–1944), priest and Uranian poet
 Thomas Bradley (1596/7–1673), priest
 Harold Davidson (1875–1937), Anglican priest
 Charles Littlehales (1871–1945), cricketer and clergyman
 Benjamin Wills Newton (1807–1899), evangelist and theologian
Jack Russell (1795–1883), priest and dog breeder
 Thomas Tregosse (c.1600–c.1670), Puritan minister
 Tom Wright (1948– ), Bishop of Durham

Politicians

 Sir Hugh Acland, 5th Baronet (1639–1714), Member of Parliament
 Anthony Ashley-Cooper, 1st Earl of Shaftesbury (1621–1683), politician
 Dick Celeste (1937– ), 64th Governor of Ohio and US Ambassador to India
 Sir John Eliot (1592–1632), statesman
 Matt Hancock (1978– ), MP for West Suffolk since 2010
 Brad Hoylman (born 1965), New York State Senator
 Humayun Kabir (1906–1969), Education Minister of India
 Sirr Al-Khatim Al-Khalifa (1919–2006), Prime minister of the Sudan
 Liaquat Ali Khan (1896–1951), politician and the first Prime Minister of Pakistan
 Pedro Pablo Kuczynski (1938– ), former President of Peru
 John Kufuor (1938– ), President of Ghana
 John Maynard (1602–1690), 17th century lawyer and politician
 Patrick Mercer, Soldier and former Member of Parliament
 Chris Murphy (1973– ), United States Senator from Connecticut (Williams at Exeter programme)
 Sir Nicholas Slanning (1606–1643), Cornish MP and Civil War officer (royalist)
 Peter Truscott (1959– ), politician

Jurisprudence
 Charles Arthur Turner (1833–1907), Jurist, Chief Justice of Madras High Court
 Herbert Edmund-Davies (1906–1992), judge
 David Feldman, Emeritus Rouse Ball Professor of English Law at the University of Cambridge and former judge of the Constitutional Court of Bosnia and Herzegovina
 John Fortescue (c.1394–c.1480), jurist
 Kenneth Hayne (1945– ), judge of the High Court of Australia
 J. C. H. James (1841–1899), public servant and magistrate of Western Australia
 Sydney Kentridge (1922– ), barrister and judge
 Sir John Laws (1945–2020), Lord Justice of Appeal and constitutional theorist 
 William Noy (1577–1634), lawyer and Attorney General to Charles I
 Julius Stone (1907–1985), legal theorist
 Noel Gratiaen (1904-1973), Attorney General and Supreme court Justice of Ceylon
 Murray Tobias (1939– ), judge of the New South Wales Court of Appeal
 Aarif Barma (1959– ), judge of the Court of Appeal of Hong Kong

Other public offices
 Malcolm Patrick Murray (1905–1979), British civil servant
 Sir Oswyn Alexander Ruthven Murray (1873–1936), Permanent Secretary to the Admiralty, 1917–1936
 Sir Robert Mark Russell (1929–2005), British Diplomat
 Major Thomas Close Smith (1878–1946), High Sheriff of Buckinghamshire, 1942
 David Warren, diplomat

Academics
C. H. S. Fifoot (1899–1975), legal scholar
 Ian Maddieson (1942– ), phonetician
 Michael O'Neill (1953– ), academic
 Joseph Nye (1937– ), political scientist
 Magdi Wahba (1925–1991), Egyptian academic, Lexicographer
 Robert J.C. Young (1950– ), FBA, Julius Silver Professor of English and Comparative Literature, New York University
 Qian Zhongshu (1910–1998), Chinese literary scholar

Science and medicine
 John Lane Bell (1945– ), mathematician and philosopher
 Sydney Brenner (1927– ), 2002 Nobel Laureate in the category "physiology or medicine"
 Richard Chorley (1927–2002), geographer
 Edgar F. Codd (1923–2003), inventor of the Relational Database
 Michael Efroimsky (1962– ), astronomer
 E. E. Evans-Pritchard (1902–1973), social anthropologist
 Malachy Hitchins (1741–1809 ), astronomer and mathematician
 Charles Lyell (1797–1875), geologist
 Brian John Marples (1907–1997), zoologist
 Arthur Peacocke (1924–2006), biochemist and theologian

Historians
 Correlli Barnett (1927– ), military historian
 Peter Brock (1920–2006), historian
 Robin Bush (1943–2010), Time Team historian
 Rev Nicolas Tindal (1687–1774), historian
 Francis Turville-Petre (1901–1941), archaeologist and excavator of the Galilee Man

Philosophers
 John Gray (1948– ), London School of Economics philosopher
 Christopher Peacocke (1950– ), philosopher

Artists, composers, writers and entertainers

 Tariq Ali (1943– ), writer and filmmaker
 Martin Amis (1949– ), novelist
 Alan Bennett (1934– ), author and actor
 R. D. Blackmore (1825–1900), author of Lorna Doone
 Edward Burne-Jones (1833–1898), artist
 Richard Burton (1925–1984), actor
 S.E. Cottam, poet, priest and publisher
 John Ford (1586–c.1640?), dramatist
 John Gardner (1917–2011), composer
 James Hamilton-Paterson, novelist and poet
 Mark Labbett (1965– ), Quiz player
 Lady Flora McDonnell (1963– ), children's author
 William Morris (1834–1896), writer, designer and socialist
 Alfred Noyes (1880–1958), poet
 Francis Turner Palgrave (1824–1897), critic and poet
 Sir Charles Hubert Hastings Parry (1848–1918), composer
 Philip Pullman (1946– ), author of His Dark Materials
 Paul William Roberts (1950–2019), novelist, journalist, travel writer, Middle East expert
Amy Sackville (1981– ), novelist
 Will Self (1961– ), novelist
 Imogen Stubbs (1961– ), actress
 J. R. R. Tolkien (1892–1973), author of The Hobbit and The Lord of the Rings
 Paul Wheeler (writer), (1934-), author of Bodyline: The Novel
Helen Marten (1985– ), artist and winner of the Hepworth Prize and Turner Prize in 2016.

Sportsmen

 Roger Bannister (1929–2018), athlete
 John Knapp (1841–1881), cricketer
 Jack Lovelock (1910–1949), athlete
 Claude Wilson (1858–1881), footballer

Media
 Raymond Raikes (1910-1999), Broadcaster, Radio director & producer
 Roger Alton (1947– ), journalist and newspaper editor
Sanchia Berg (1964– ), BBC correspondent
 Reeta Chakrabarti (1964– ), BBC correspondent
 Russell Harty (1934–1988), television presenter
 Michael Imison (1935– ), BBC television director, story editor and literary agent
 Boisfeuillet Jones, Jr. (1946–  ), media executive and former newspaper publisher
 Robert Moore (1963– ), ITV News correspondent
 Robert Robinson (1927–2011), radio and television presenter
 Ned Sherrin (1931–2007), broadcaster, author and stage director
 Wynford Vaughan-Thomas (1908–1987), broadcaster
 Richard Simons (1952-)News Editor ITN, Director of Programmes Meridian Broadcaating

Other alumni
 Mark Allen (1950– ), businessman and former British spy
 Sir Ronald Cohen (1945– ), businessman 
 Dominic Cummings (1971– ), campaign director of Vote Leave and chief adviser to British Prime Minister Boris Johnson 
 David Michael Webb (1965– ), corporate and economic governance activist

See also
 List of rectors of Exeter College, Oxford

References

External links
 College history

 *
Exeter alumni